Warren Armory is a historic National Guard armory located at Warren, Warren County, Pennsylvania.  It was built in 1909, and is a 2 1/2-story, brick building with a gambrel roof in the Romanesque style. The drill hall is located on the second floor.  It has a projecting central entrance bay, stone sills and lintels, brick turrets, and a crenelated parapet.

It was added to the National Register of Historic Places in 1991.

References

Armories on the National Register of Historic Places in Pennsylvania
Romanesque Revival architecture in Pennsylvania
Infrastructure completed in 1909
Buildings and structures in Warren, Pennsylvania
National Register of Historic Places in Warren County, Pennsylvania